The 1959 Open Championship was held at the Royal Automobile Club in Pall Mall, London from 11 March - 16 March.
Azam Khan finally won his first title after finishing runner-up to his older brother Hashim Khan on three previous occasions. He defeated Mo Khan in the final.

Defending champion and top seed Hashim Khan had withdrawn from the Championships after ankle problems and another seed Roshan Khan had been recalled to service by the Pakistan navy.

Seeds

Results

+ amateur
^ seeded

References

Men's British Open Squash Championships
Men's British Open Championship
Men's British Open Squash Championship
Men's British Open Squash Championship
Men's British Open Squash Championship
Squash competitions in London